Orocrambus horistes is a moth in the family Crambidae. It was described by Edward Meyrick in 1902. O. horistes is endemic to New Zealand, where it has only been recorded from the Chatham Islands.

The wingspan is 25–29 mm. Adults have been recorded from December to January.

References

Crambinae
Moths described in 1902
Moths of New Zealand
Endemic fauna of New Zealand
Taxa named by Edward Meyrick
Endemic moths of New Zealand